Cortegada is a municipality in the Ourense, Galicia, Spain. It contains the abandoned hamlet of A Barca.

References  

Municipalities in the Province of Ourense